Michal Neuvirth (born 23 March 1988) is a Czech former professional ice hockey goaltender. He played for the Washington Capitals, New York Islanders, Buffalo Sabres, and Philadelphia Flyers in the National Hockey League (NHL). He was selected 34th overall by the Washington Capitals in the second round of the 2006 NHL Entry Draft.

Playing career

Junior
After being drafted into the NHL by the Capitals, Neuvirth began a two-year major junior career in the Ontario Hockey League (OHL). He began with the Plymouth Whalers in 2006–07 before being traded on 13 November 2007, to the Windsor Spitfires, along with defenceman Tom Kane and a fourth-round draft pick in 2009 in exchange for defenceman Michal Jordán, goaltender Matt Hackett, a 2008 second-round draft pick and a third-round pick in 2009. After spending less than half a season with the Spitfires, he was traded yet again on 8 January 2008, to the Oshawa Generals along with Ryan Baldwin for forward Justin Shugg, goaltender Jakub Kovář and second-round picks in 2008 and 2011.

Professional

Washington Capitals
Neuvirth turned pro in 2008–09 with the South Carolina Stingrays, the Capitals' ECHL affiliate. During his short stint with the Stingrays, he was named to the 2009 ECHL All-Star Game for the American Conference. He was called up to the Hershey Bears of the American Hockey League (AHL) during the season and, before long, received his first NHL call-up to the Capitals when starting goaltender Semyon Varlamov was sidelined due to injury. He made his NHL debut on 14 February 2009, against the Tampa Bay Lightning. Making 31 saves, including a breakaway glove save on Vincent Lecavalier, Neuvirth backstopped the Capitals to a 5–1 victory for his first NHL win. He then played in his Capitals home debut on 26 February against the Atlanta Thrashers, recording another win with a 21-save effort. He finished the season appearing in five games total for the Capitals with a 2–1 record and 3.00 goals against average (GAA).

After being returned to the Bears, Neuvirth helped his team to the 2009 Calder Cup finals. He recorded a shutout in Game 3 for the Bears to take a 2–1 series lead against the Manitoba Moose. Neuvirth then went on with the Hershey Bears to win the 2009 Calder Cup, earning MVP honors after his Game 6 win. Neuvirth went 16–6 in the playoffs and finished the post-season with a 1.92 GAA, topping Frédéric Cassivi's previous AHL playoff best of 2.10 GAA.

After helping the Bears to the back-to-back Calder Cups in 2010, Neuvirth was named the starting goaltender of the Capitals' season opener on 8 October against Atlanta, in which he made 27 saves in a 4–2 loss. Neuvirth would go on to beat out Semyon Varlamov for the starting position for the entire season. Despite a solid season as Washington's starter and an adequate playoff performance, Washington would demote Neuvirth to backup goaltender status to make way for Tomáš Vokoun, trading away incumbent backup Varlamov to the Colorado Avalanche in the process. Vokoun's run as Washington's starter only lasted one season, however, and he was injured before the playoffs began. Unfortunately for Neuvirth, he himself was also injured, allowing third goaltender Braden Holtby to start Game 1 of the first round series against the Boston Bruins. Even though Neuvirth managed to return to health in time for Game 3, Holtby went on to start for the duration of Washington's playoff run in 2012. In the off-season, Vokoun left to take the backup goaltender job with the Pittsburgh Penguins. New Capitals head coach Adam Oates then confirmed Holtby as the new starting goaltender of the Washington Capitals during training camp, but failed to rule out Neuvirth reclaiming the starter's role if he were to outplay Holtby.

Buffalo Sabres
On 5 March 2014, Neuvirth was traded by the Capitals, along with Rostislav Klesla, to the Buffalo Sabres in exchange for Jaroslav Halák and a third round pick. Neuvirth closed out the season with an (0-2-0) record. The next season, Neuvirth posted a record of (6-17-3).

New York Islanders
Almost one year later, on 2 March 2015, Neuvirth was traded by the Sabres to the New York Islanders in exchange for Chad Johnson and a third-round draft pick. Neuvirth recorded a (1-3-1) record with the Islanders.

Philadelphia Flyers
On 1 July 2015, Neuvirth signed a two-year contract as a free agent with the Philadelphia Flyers, to serve as a backup to Steve Mason.

On 1 April 2017, Neuvirth suddenly collapsed on the ice during a game against the New Jersey Devils while there was a stoppage in play at 7:37 of the first period. He was rushed to a nearby hospital after being taken off the ice on a stretcher. Backup goaltender Anthony Stolarz replaced Neuvirth for the rest of the game, which the Flyers won 3–0. The Flyers announced the next afternoon he had been released from the hospital and all tests were normal.

Later years
After four seasons under contract with the Flyers, Neuvirth left as a free agent following an injury-plagued 2018–19 season. Unable to secure an NHL contract, Neuvirth agreed to an invitation to attend the Toronto Maple Leafs' training camp on a professional tryout (PTO) contract on 22 July 2019.

On 24 September, Toronto released Neuvirth from his PTO contract. As a free agent, Neuvirth sat out the majority of the season before signing a one-year contract in returning to the Czech Republic for the remainder of the year with hometown club, HC Sparta Praha of the ELH, on 23 January 2020. Neuvirth was unable to make any appearances with the club despite being contracted with Sparta over the next two seasons due to lingering injury problems.

Records
Calder Cup record; single-playoffs goals against average - 1.92 GAA (surpassed Frédéric Cassivi, 2.10 GAA)

Personal life
Neuvirth married Monika Hybnerova in June 2014, but the couple divorced in July 2015.

On 29 May 2018, Neuvirth married Czech musician Karolina Gudasová, the sister of former Philadelphia Flyers teammate Radko Gudas. He and Karolina have two children together a, daughter ) and ).

Career statistics

Regular season and playoffs

Awards and honours

References

External links

 

1988 births
Living people
Buffalo Sabres players
Czech expatriate ice hockey players in Canada
Czech expatriate ice hockey players in the United States
Czech ice hockey goaltenders
Hershey Bears players
Lehigh Valley Phantoms players
New York Islanders players
Oshawa Generals players
Sportspeople from Ústí nad Labem
Philadelphia Flyers players
Plymouth Whalers players
South Carolina Stingrays players
HC Sparta Praha players
Washington Capitals draft picks
Washington Capitals players
Windsor Spitfires players